Hwang Min-kyoung (born 2 June 1990) is a South Korean professional volleyball player. She is part of the South Korea women's national volleyball team. At club level, she plays for Suwon Hyundai Engineering & Construction Hillstate, where she is also the team captain, a role she has held for three years.

Career 
She became a volleyball player from her elementary school final year.
She participated at the 2011 FIVB Volleyball World Grand Prix, 2017 FIVB Volleyball World Grand Prix, 2017 FIVB Volleyball Women's World Grand Champions Cup.

Clubs 
  Korea Expressway Corporation Hi-Pass, 2008-2016
  GS Caltex Seoul KIXX, 2016-2017
  Suwon Hyundai Engineering & Construction Hillstate, 2017-

References

External links 
 FIVB Profile

1990 births
Living people
South Korean women's volleyball players
Asian Games medalists in volleyball
Volleyball players at the 2018 Asian Games
Medalists at the 2018 Asian Games
Asian Games bronze medalists for South Korea